Cool Kadın is Turkish pop singer Ajda Pekkan's sixteenth studio album, which was released on 2 June 2006 in Turkey. The album was certified "Gold" by selling over 100 thousand copies.

Track listing

References

External links 
 
 Cool Kadın - iTunes

Ajda Pekkan albums
2006 albums
Turkish-language albums
French-language albums